The 2007 Fortis Championships Luxembourg was a women's tennis tournament played on indoor hard courts. It was the 12th edition of the Fortis Championships Luxembourg, and was part of the Tier II Series of the 2007 WTA Tour. It was held in Kockelscheuer, Luxembourg. The singles title was won by Ana Ivanovic while the doubles title was won by Iveta Benešová and Janette Husárová.

Champions

Singles

 Ana Ivanovic defeated  Daniela Hantuchová, 3–6, 6–4, 6–4

Doubles

 Iveta Benešová /  Janette Husárová defeated  Victoria Azarenka /  Shahar Pe'er, 6–4, 6–2

External links
Singles, Doubles and Qualifying Singles Draws

Fortis Championships Luxembourg
Luxembourg Open
Fortis Championships Luxembourg